Marco Simone Golf and Country Club (also known as Golf Marco Simone) is a golf course in Guidonia, Rome, Italy. It is 10 miles from the city centre of Rome and has 2 golf courses, an 18-hole Championship Course and a 9-hole Resort Course. In 2015 it won the bid to host the 2023 Ryder Cup.

History

The golf club was named after the castle of Marco Simone. The castle was a Roman fortified manor farm. The tower was built approximately in the year 1000 and later in the Middle Ages additional buildings built around it.

In the 1970s Laura Biagiotti, the Italian high fashion designer, and her husband Gianni Cigna both lived in the restored castle. By 1989 the golf course had been designed and built. The architects were Jim Fazio and David Mezzacane. The golf course was the venue of the 1994 and 2021 Italian Open golf championships, which were won by Eduardo Romero and Nicolai Højgaard respectively.

Bidding for the 2022 Ryder Cup

Ryder Cup Europe only received four bids for the 2022 Ryder Cup when the bidding closed on 30 April 2015. On 14 December 2015, Rome announced that it was to host the 2022 Ryder Cup, beating off bids from Germany, Austria and Spain. On 8 July 2020, the PGA Tour announced that the 2020 Ryder Cup was postponed by one year due to the impact of the COVID-19 pandemic. This consequently pushed to 2022 Ryder Cup back one year to 2023.

References

External links 

Official website 
The official website of the 2022 Rome Ryder Cup bid
 

Golf clubs and courses in Italy
Ryder Cup venues